The Ballroom Scene (also known as the Ballroom community, Ballroom culture, or just Ballroom) is an African-American and Latino underground LGBTQ+ subculture that originated in New York City. Beginning in the late 20th century, Black and Latino drag queens began to organize their own pageants in opposition to racism experienced in established drag queen pageant circuits. Though racially integrated for the participants, the judges of these circuits were mostly white people. While the initial establishment of Ballroom mimicked these drag queen pageants, the inclusion of gay men and trans women would transform the Ballroom scene into what it is today: a multitude of categories that all LGBTQ+ people can participate in.
Attendees "walk" these categories for trophies and cash prizes. Most participants in Ballroom belong to groups known as "houses", where chosen families of friends form relationships and communities separate from their families of origin, from which they may be estranged.

Houses
Houses function as alternative families, primarily consisting of Black and Latino LGBTQ+ individuals, and provide shelter for those who feel ostracized by conventional support systems. Houses are led by "mothers" and "fathers" who are experienced members of the ballroom scene, typically drag queens, gay men or transgender women, who provide guidance and support for their house "children". The children of a House are each other's "siblings".

All houses were founded in U.S. cities, mostly in the Northeast. These include New York City, Newark, Jersey City, Philadelphia, Baltimore, Washington, D.C., Atlanta, GA as well as Chicago and Oakland, California. Houses that win trophies and gain recognition through years of participation (usually ten years) reach the rank of legendary. Houses with 20+ years of participation are deemed iconic. Typically, house members adopt the name of their house as their last name. Those currently not in a house carry the last name "007".

Notable Houses 
Notable Houses include:
 The Royal House of LaBeija (founded by Crystal LaBeija, co-founder of ballroom culture; and chiefly run by Pepper LaBeija in the 1980s and 1990s)
 The Gorgeous House of Gucci (founded by Gorgeous Jack Mizrahi Gucci, Kelly Mizrahi Gucci, Marlon Mizrahi Gucci and Trace Gucci)
 The House of Amazon (founded by Leiomy Maldonado).
 The House of Aviance (founded by Mother Juan Aviance)
 The House of Balenciaga (founded by Harold Balenciaga)
 The House of Dupree (founded by Paris Dupree; currently closed).
 The House of Ebony (founded by Larry Preylow Ebony and Richard Fears Ebony)
 The House of Ferré (founded by Milan Christopher)
 The House of Garçon (founded by Whitney and Shannon Garçon)
 The House of Juicy Couture (founded by Courtney Balenciaga)
 The House of Ladosha (founded by La Fem LaDosha and Cunty Crawford)
 The House of Latex
 The House of Maison Margiela (founded by Vini Margiela)
 The House of Mizrahi (founded by Andre Mizrahi)

 The Iconic International House Of Miyake-Mugler (founded by The Iconic Overall Founding Father David Miyake-Mugler, Raleigh and Julian Mugler)
 The House of Lanvin (founded by Meechie & Kenny Lanvin)
 The Iconic International House of St. Laurent (founded by Octavia St. Laurent, Christopher Hall, and Robert Marcomeni in 1982)
 The House of Ninja (founded by Willi Ninja)

 The House of Xtravaganza (founded by Hector Valle, and chiefly run by Hector Xtravaganza and Angie Xtravaganza in the 1980s)
 The Royal House of Nina Oricci (founded by Gillette and Omari Mizrahi Oricci)
 The House of West (founded by James West and Anthony West)
 The House of Du'Mure Versailles (founded by Aaliyah Du'Mure Versailles and Scott Alexander Du'Mure Versailles)
 The House of Balmain (founded by Rodney Balmain)

Competition

To compete against each other, Houses walk a plethora of categories at a given ball. Participants dress according to the guidelines of the category in which they are competing. These guidelines are created by the promoters of a Ball and may/may not adhere to an overall theme for the Ball. Regardless, participants are expected to display appropriate adherence to the rules of a category. Balls range in scale from "mini balls" (typically characterized by a small selection of categories, few people walking, and a runtime of 1 to 2 hours) to mainstream events (characterized by the presence of most, if not all, categories in Ballroom, a significant number of participants for each category, and a runtime exceeding 4 hours with the largest of Balls capping at 8 hours).

Categories
Categories are split into demographics of the participants. Flyers will always tell contestants how each category will be demographically divided. These demographics are: 
 Femme Queens (FQ): trans women
 Butch Queens (BQ): gay men
 Transmen: trans men
 Drags: gay men in drags
 Women: cis gendered women
 Male Figure: the collection of butch queens and trans men
 Female Figure: the collection of femme queens, drags, and women
 Open to All: the collection of all demographics

Some categories include:
 Voguing – Use the vogue elements of hands, catwalk, duckwalk, floor performance, spins and dips. The voguing category has the following variants:
Virgin Vogue – Vogue category for participants who have been voguing for less than one year.
Beginner's Vogue – Vogue category for participants who have been voguing for less than two years.
Hand Performance – Judged on a participants mastery of the "Hands" element, using the hands to tell a story.
 Old Way - Judged on participants' ability to perform the original style of voguing, made popular in the 80s.
 New Way - Judged on participants' ability to perform the updated version of the Old Way, characterized by arm control and flexibility. 
 FQ Realness – Judged on participants' ability to blend in with cisgender women.
 BQ Realness – Judged on participants' ability to blend in with male heterosexuals. The category of BQ Realness is further divided into sub categories:
Schoolboy: Those who have the look/demeanor of a college attendee.
Thugs: Those who have the look/demeanor of a hyper-masculine Black man.
Pretty Boy: Those who have the look/demeanor of a metrosexual.
Executive: Those who have the look/demeanor of "corporate America".
Transman
 Realness With a Twist (Twister/RWT) – Judged on participants' ability to convey realness, followed by those same participants' ability to vogue.
 Runway – Judged on participants' ability to walk like a supermodel. Runway is divided into two different categories: European (the feminine aspect of runway) and All-American (the masculine aspect of runway). Both aspects of Runway require the participant to usually, but not always, construct an outfit based on the theme/parameter of the category. These outfits are known as "effects". BQ Runway is sometimes divided by tall boys, short boys, and big boys. The Runway category has the following variants:
Virgin Runway – Runway for participants who have been walking for less than one year.
Beginner's Runway – Runway for participants who have been walking for less than two years.
 Bizarre – Judged on participants' creativity to design an over-the-top/out-of-the-box effect based on the theme/parameters of the category.
 Labels – Judged on the labels a participant is wearing, their authenticity and the overall look.
 Face – Judged on a participant's skin and "symmetry of features" including teeth, eyes, nose, lips and jaw line as well as a participants ability to "sell" their face. While the category may call for an effect, ultimately the judges will only look at the face of a competitor. The Face category has the following variants:
Face with Performance – Judged on a participant's ability to sell face using the elements of hands, catwalk, and duckwalk.
Washed Face – Participants walk the category without the application of makeup.
New Face – Participants making a debut in the face category.
 Sex Siren – Judge on participant's sex appeal and how well they are able to persuade, tease, and titillate the judges. Some do so by stripping all their clothes off, others do it through erotic dancing, and some combine the two in order to attempt to win.
 Body — Judged on the shape/tone of the body. The Body category has two variants:
Woman's Body / FQ Body: judged on the curvaceous shape and structure of the Black woman's body. FQ Body was the original category. This category is specifically for the thick and curvaceous.
BQ Body: Judged on muscle definition and symmetry. This category is akin to bodybuilding.
 Commentator vs. Commentator – Allows aspiring (and current) emcees, known as commentators, to showcase their ability to commentate/chant over a beat.
 Butch Queen up in Pumps – Judged on a BQs ability to remain balanced and poised in a heel, and the heel itself.
 Best Dressed – Judged on a participant's ability to craft a formal effect that adheres to the parameters of the category.
 Legendary/Iconic – Any of the previous categories exclusively for those who are legends and icons.

History
Genny Beemyn wrote in their book Trans Bodies, Trans Selves that members of the underground LGBTQ+ community in large cities of the late nineteenth century began to organize masquerade balls known as "drags" in direct defiance of laws banning citizens from wearing clothes of the opposite gender. William Dorsey Swann, the first person known to describe himself as a drag queen, organized a series of drag balls in Washington, D.C. during the 1880s and 1890s. Most of the attendees of Swann's gatherings were men who were formerly enslaved. Because these events were secretive, invitations were often quietly made at places like the YMCA. Swann was arrested in police raids numerous times, including in the first documented case of arrests for female impersonation in the United States, on April 12, 1888.

In his essay "Spectacles of Colors", Langston Hughes describes his experience at a New York drag ball in the 1920s."Strangest and gaudiest of all Harlem spectacles in the '20s, and still the strangest and gaudiest, is the annual Hamilton Club Lodge Ball at Rockland Palace Casino. I once attended as a guest of A'Lelia Walker. It is the ball where men dress as women and women dress as men. During the height of the New Negro era and the tourist invasion of Harlem, it was fashionable for the intelligentsia and social leaders of both Harlem and the downtown area to occupy boxes at this ball and look down from above at the queerly assorted throng on the dancing floor, males in flowing gowns and feathered headdresses and females in tuxedoes and box-back suits." —Langston Hughes

The first known ball at the Hamilton Lodge was integrated, at a time when racial segregation was upheld in the United States. Although the ball was integrated, racism was still present. Few Black performers received prizes. There were no Black judges and many believed that the balls were rigged so that only Whites could win. This racial discrimination prompted Black and Latino attendees to form their own balls, and modern ballroom culture began to develop out of Harlem in the late 1960s, and expanded rapidly to other major cities. In New Orleans in the 1950s, they appeared at Mardi Gras celebrations as krewes. The Sons of Tennessee Williams, a documentary by Tim Wolff released in 2010, follows their history.

Ball culture was first captured and shown to a mainstream audience in Jennie Livingston's documentary Paris is Burning (1990). With the rise of social media, ball culture has migrated to such countries as Canada, Japan, and the UK.

Cities with prominent ball culture

New York City

New York City is the center of the world's drag ball culture. Cross dressing balls have existed in the city since the 1920s, consisting of primarily white men. They competed in fashion shows in bars two or three times a year. Black queens would sometimes participate but rarely won prizes due to discrimination. In the 1970s, Black queens Crystal LaBeija and her friend, Lottie, began their own drag ball titled House of LaBeija, kickstarting the current ballroom scene in New York. Crystal and Lottie are credited with founding the first House in ballroom. In 1989, The House of Latex was created as a call to action in the ballroom community to bridge the gap between HIV and STI prevention and ballroom culture.

Washington, DC 
William Dorsey Swann organized a series of drag balls in the DC area during the 1880s and 1890s.

This account from the metropolitan Washington, D.C. area describes how ball culture and drag houses developed about 1960:

The dance styles which later characterized drag houses had not been developed; competitions between houses involved standard drag performances in which entertainers lip-synced or, rarely, sang. In contrast to the New York houses in Paris Is Burning, some of the Washington, D.C. house mothers were white. African-American drag queens were a prominent part of the community:

The Washington, D.C. ball community consists primarily of African-American and Latino participants, and has adopted many attributes seen in Paris Is Burning. Nineteen-sixties-style drag shows and competitions still exist, with their own audience. Ball patrons will find similar categories (such as "banjee thug realness" and "vogue") as audience members.

The Washington ballroom scene was created by Icon Founder Lowell Khanh (Lowell Thomas Hickman, (1987)) and Icon Eric Christian-Bazaar. The House of Khanh was the first House outside of New York that wasn't a part of a New York house. From the House of Khanh came the House of Milan. 
During the 1990s, more houses appeared in the area due to the efforts of Twain Miyake-Mugler ("father" of the House of Miyake Mugler, D.C. Chapter), Icon Harold Balenciaga (founder of the house of Balenciaga), Icons Shannon Garcon and Whitney Garcon (founders of the House of Garcon and charter members of The Legendary House of Miyake-Mugler). The city hosts a series of annual balls, in which contestants compete for trophies and cash prizes.

Baltimore
Baltimore has a well-established ball community.

In 1931, the newspaper Baltimore Afro-American covered a local drag ball. The article detailed the "coming out of new debutantes into gay society". By the 1930s, the drag ball culture was starting to emerge in the Black communities in major cities such as Baltimore, Chicago, and New York. The Afro reported that "The coming out of new debutantes into homosexual society was the outstanding feature of Baltimore's eighth annual frolic of the pansies when the art club was host to the neuter gender at the Elks' Hall."

Philadelphia
Philadelphia has a well-established ball community. Philadelphia's first ball was the Oynx Ball which took place in August 1989.

The documentary How Do I Look partially focused on the ball community in Philadelphia.

Atlanta
Atlanta has the most prominent ball community south of Washington, D.C.

Several balls are held in Atlanta each year. Also several major houses established in other major cities have opened chapters in Atlanta.

St. Louis 
Most of St. Louis' ballroom scene is intertwined with the drag scene since the ballroom scene is not as major as the other metropolitan cities like Chicago, Atlanta, New York, etc. According to Mapping LGBTQ STL, the first ball in St. Louis was called 'Miss Fannie's Artists' Ball', which was organized by the Jolly Jesters Social Group, and the ball helped to raise funds for charitable institutions in the Black community. This was at a time when those participating were called 'female impersonators' which we refer today as drag performers. Now there is a distinct separation between both drag culture and performers and ball culture and performers, even though as stated previously, most artists and performers participate in both. 

There is also a Kiki scene in St. Louis, smaller than both the drag and ballroom scene, but emerging. One of the organizers for the Kiki and mainstream balls is Maven Logik Lee and one of the commentators/MC is Meko Lee Burr. A major ballroom house in the scene is the House of Ebony, St. Louis chapter, founded by Spirit Ebony.

HIV/AIDS epidemic 

The ball community has been heavily impacted by the HIV/AIDS epidemic as transgender people of color and men who have sex with men (MSM) are the highest risk communities for contracting the virus in the U.S. Out of all estimated HIV diagnoses in males, MSM make up 78%. In the United States, MSM represent 61% of all diagnosis of HIV. Young black men are especially at risk for contracting the virus. In 2009, the percentage of black MSM, aged 13–29, who were diagnosed with HIV increased by 48%. Many healthcare providers and medical service professionals have since reached out to the community to perform research, teach sex education, offer free testing, and host balls to promote safe sex, such as the Latex Ball that is hosted by the Gay Men's Health Crisis (GMHC) in New York.

Researchers with ProjectVOGUE also reached out to the ball community for assistance with vaccine trials and testing because minority participation is generally very low. This low participation stems from a historical distrust that African-Americans and Latinos have had of the government, that results from government-sponsored projects such as the Tuskegee syphilis experiment. ProjectVOGUE is led by researchers and professionals from the University of Rochester School of Medicine and Dentistry, Florida International University, the Fred Hutchinson Cancer Research Center, and the MOCHA (Men of Color Health Association) Center. They aimed to create a partnership with the Western New York ball community and held monthly meetings where safe sex methods were taught along with information about the HIV trial vaccine. Community members were initially incentivized to attend with $25 gift cards and transportation vouchers.

These joint meeting sessions also branched out to cover topics such as substance abuse, STI prevention, violence within the ball community, and more. ProjectVOGUE researchers utilized the House "family" structure by taking 15 "mothers", "fathers", founders, and more on a retreat to gauge the community's knowledge of HIV, while encouraging them to teach their "children" about HIV prevention. At the end of the study, participants had an increased knowledge about HIV, HIV vaccine research, and were more likely to participate in a study.

This is just one of the many partnerships that have formed across the country between the healthcare industry and the ball community to encourage HIV prevention. Overall, HIV/AIDS took, and continues to take, the lives of many ball participants, but that trauma has caused the community to grow tighter as members mourned, grieved, and celebrated the lives of their friends together.

Influences
New York's ballroom culture has had a highly significant cultural impact from the 1980s to the present day.

Dance
The most notable influence of ball culture on mainstream society is voguing, a dance style originating in Harlem ballrooms during the latter half of the 20th century. It appeared in the video for Malcolm McLaren's Deep in Vogue, released in 1989, and Madonna's "Vogue", released in 1990 (one year before the documentary Paris Is Burning). The dance group Vogue Evolution, from America's Best Dance Crew, has again sparked interest in voguing.

Voguing started in Drag Balls held by the queer community of color. The competitions were divided up into Houses that then competed in different categories, in which one of the categories was voguing. Named after Vogue magazine, voguing required dancers to mirror the poses held by models, with emphasis placed on arm and hand movements. Dancers would play out elaborate scenes such as applying makeup or taking phone calls while dancing down the catwalk. Dancer and choreographer Willi Ninja has been recognized as the "Grandfather of Vogue" and the dance, as well as Ninja himself, were covered in the documentary Paris is Burning.

Language
The legacy of ball culture on current drag is extensive. Language that grew out of it is common among the LGBTQ+ community as a whole (terms such as "reading" and "shade" meaning insults used in battles of wit, and "spilling tea" meaning gossiping). The use of categories and judging can be seen on popular reality TV programs such as RuPaul's Drag Race. The structure of Houses is widely used among drag queens today, as well as associated notions of community and family. Attitudes of defiance and subversion that were necessary for black, Latino, queer, and trans participants, as they navigated discrimination, exclusion, and the ravages of the AIDS epidemic, form an essential part of drag culture as a whole.

Ballroom dialect became more widely used in gay slang, fashion industry jargon and mainstream colloquial language.
 Reading: to read a person is to highlight and exaggerate all of the flaws of a person, from their ridiculous clothes, to their flawed makeup and anything else the reader can come up with. It is a battle of wit, in which the winner is one who gets the crowd to laugh the most.
 Shade: shade is an art form that developed from reading. Rather than the aim to insult, someone works with the medium of backhanded compliments. An example is to suggest that someone's beautiful dress makes people almost forget that she has five o'clock shadow.
 Voguing: dance invented in 1970s Harlem and performed notably by Willi Ninja
 Walking: walking to acquire the admiration of ball contestants
 Mopping: shoplifting, usually clothes to walk in at a ball
 Werk: an exclamatory phrase used to connote admiration and content with someone's actions
 Fierce: similar to "work", meaning something to admire and celebrate
 Butch queen: an androgynous gay male person or a masculine-looking drag queen
 Mother: the matriarch of a house, often taking a mentoring role for members of the house, typically a "Legend" in the ballroom scene
 House: a group of individuals that compete in balls under the same name. Often, they are your chosen family.
 Dip: iconic drop done by vogue dancers, also known as a deathdrop or shawam in pop culture
 Chop: when the person competing is disqualified by one of the judges
 Legendary, or "Legend": a title added before an individual's name meaning years of hard work
 Iconic, or "Icon": similar to "Legend", this is the highest achievement in ballroom. It means countless trophies have been won and memorable moments have been made by this individual
 007: a person who is not a member of a House

Music

A key element of balls is also the music, which is typically characterized by distinct, up tempo beats that are overlaid with the "raps" of commentators or emcees. Lyrics are just as stylized as the beats and often praise queerness and femininity through typically vulgar language and usage of words like "cunt" and "pussy". Historically, the music featured at balls has been whatever is popular within the black LGBT community at the time, ranging from disco, to club music, to house, to rap and R&B. House music, the primary sound of the balls, is always upwards of 120 beats per minute and has African roots, which is reflected in the rhythm.

Today, it is common for older house classics like "Work This Pussy" by Ellis D, "Cunty" by Kevin Aviance, and "The Ha Dance" by Masters at Work to be remixed into new hits by the current wave of DJs and producers. Ballroom Icon DJ's Vjuan Allure, Angel X, and MikeQ, were the first DJs considered to have developed the first remixes of ballroom sound. In order, Vjuan Allure was the first to remix "The Ha Dance" in 2000, followed by Angel X in 2002, and then MikeQ in 2005. Overall, ball culture has been a fertile ground for new forms of house music and other genres of electronic dance music through its DJs.

According to PBS Sound Field interview with MikeQ, one of ball music pioneers, ball music started as house music being played at ballroom parties. Over time, distinct features of ball music emerged, for instance the "Ha" crash, being placed on the every fourth of 4 beats and the minimal repetitive vocals, provided by ball commentators. The "Ha" crash cymbals often signify the time for ball dancers to strike a pose or hit the floor. Modern vogue music, along with house, incroporates elements of disco, funk, hip hop, contemporary R&B, Jersey club and other electronic music.

The culture has also influenced a wave of queer hip hop artists such as Zebra Katz, House of Ladosha, and Le1f.

Fashion
Ball culture has influenced "the über-puffed-up peacock sexuality" of contemporary mainstream hip hop. A professor at New York University said about gay black culture, "Today's queer mania for ghetto fabulousness and bling masks its elemental but silent relationship to even more queer impulses toward fabulousness in the 1980s."

Mainstream entertainment
In September 2006, Beyoncé told a reporter from The Independent "how inspired she's been by the whole drag-house circuit in the States, an unsung part of black American culture where working-class gay men channel ultra-glamour in mocked-up catwalk shows. 'I still have that in me', she says of the 'confidence and the fire you see on stage...'"

In the media
Most of the New York-based houses of the time appeared in the 1990 documentary film Paris Is Burning. In 1997, Emanuel Xavier published a seminal poetry manifesto titled Pier Queen and, in 1999, his novel Christ Like featured the first fictional main character involved with the Houses. The 2016 film Kiki provided an updated portrait of the ball culture scene. In 2017, as part of a documentary series on New Zealand cultural identity, Vice Media produced an episode about New Zealand's ball culture, entitled "FAFSWAG: Auckland's Underground Vogue Scene".

In 2009, Logo TV aired the reality television series RuPaul's Drag Race, a competition show where drag queens face off in a series of challenges heavily inspired by competitions commonly seen in ballroom culture. Created by prominent drag queen RuPaul Charles, competitors sew, act, sing, and lip sync for a chance to win $100,000, a one-year supply of Anastasia Beverly Hills cosmetics and the title of "America's Next Drag Superstar". The show has won a plethora of awards and spawned several spin-off series. The competition format, slang, and type of drag exhibited on the show is heavily influenced by ball culture.

In 2018, Viceland aired a docuseries, My House, following six people in the New York City ball culture. In the spring of 2018, the television series Pose premiered, set in New York and following participants in ball culture, as well as others in the 1980s Manhattan. The show was created by Steven Canals, Brad Falchuk, and Ryan Murphy.

On April 18, 2019, it was announced that the premiere of the feature film Port Authority, a New York love story between a black trans woman from the ballroom scene and a cisgender man from the Midwest would compete in the Un Certain Regard competition at the prestigious 2019 Cannes Film Festival. It was backed and produced by Martin Scorsese and RT Features. Leyna Bloom's debut in Port Authority was the first time in the festival's history that a trans woman of color was featured in a leading role. The film is credited with authentic casting and representation. Port Authority features scenes at balls, as well as during rehearsals and of queer youths' chosen family. Almost every actor that plays a role of significance in the ballroom scenes in the film, including competitors, judges, and house members, are active members of the ballroom scene today. Prior to being cast, Leyna Bloom became known internationally as a model and dancer, and she is active in the mainstream ballroom scene as New York City mother of the House of Miyake-Mugler. She is known in ball culture as the "Polynesian Princess", having made an international name for herself walking the category of face.

In 2020, the voguing reality competition web series Legendary premiered on the HBO Max streaming service. The series follows members of eight prominent houses as they navigate their way through nine balls (dancing, voguing, etc.), with a $100,000 prize awarded to the winner.

In 2022, the Canadian Broadcasting Corporation premiered the web series CBX: Canadian Ballroom Extravaganza, which challenged teams consisting of one ballroom performer and one emerging filmmaker to create short films highlighting performances in each of five ballroom categories.

See also

 Banjee
 Drag show
 Drag pageantry
 Imperial Court System

Works:
 Paris is Burning
 Pose (TV series)
 How Do I Look
 Saturday Church
 Legendary (TV series)

General:
 LGBT culture in New York City
 African-American LGBT community

References

Further reading

External links

  – feature-length documentary
  (1989) – short documentary
 Weems, M. (2008). A History of Festive Homosexuality: 1700–1969 CE. In The Fierce Tribe: Masculine Identity and Performance in the Circuit (pp. 81–100). Logan, Utah: University Press of Colorado. doi:10.2307/j.ctt4cgq6k.14

 
African-American culture
Drag (clothing)
Culture of New York City
LGBT culture in the United States
LGBT African-American culture
African-American LGBT organizations
LGBT Hispanic and Latino American culture
Nightlife in New York City
Transgender culture